Annie Whittle is a British-born New Zealand singer and actress who has appeared on such shows as Shortland Street, where she played Barbara Heywood for four years and has had a singing career that has spanned three decades. She was previously married to director and producer Bruce Morrison.

Her most notable film appearance was in The World's Fastest Indian (2005).

Filmography

Television
 A Week of It (1977–1979) .... Various Characters
 Castaways .... "Castaways of the General Grant" (1978)
 Under the Mountain (1982) .... Mrs. Matheson in "Maar" (1982)
 An Age Apart (1983) .... Air Hostess in Episode #1.1 (1983)
 The Makutu on Mrs Jones (1983) .... Mrs Jones
 The Billy T. James Show (1984) .... Various roles
 "Heartland" (2001) .... Herself
 Shortland Street (2001–2005) .... Barbara Heywood
 Kai Korero (2006) TV series .... Muriel Spalding
 Amazing Extraordinary Friends (2008) .... Madame Lulu in "Love and Marriage" (20 September 2008)
 Outrageous Fortune (2006–2007) .... Bev
 Go Girls (2009) .... Jan McMann

Film
 Trial Run (1984) .... Rosemary Edmonds
 Queen City Rocker (1986) .... Drunk Wife
 The World's Fastest Indian (2005) .... Fran
 Piece of My Heart (2009) .... Flora
  Bellbird (2019) .... Beth

Discography

Singles

Awards
Won the New Zealand Recording Industry Award for Top Female Recording Artist twice, in 1975 and in 1976.

External links

References 

21st-century New Zealand women singers
New Zealand film actresses
New Zealand television actresses
English emigrants to New Zealand
Actresses from Manchester
Living people
Year of birth missing (living people)
New Zealand soap opera actresses
20th-century New Zealand actresses
21st-century New Zealand actresses